The 1994 Philippine Basketball Association (PBA) Commissioner's Cup was the second conference of the 1994 PBA season. It started on June 17 and ended on September 9, 1994. The tournament is an Import-laden format, which requires an import or a pure-foreign player for each team.

Format
The following format will be observed for the duration of the conference:
The teams were divided into 2 groups.

Group A:
Purefoods TJ Hotdogs
San Miguel Beermen
Sta. Lucia Realtors
Tondeña 65 Rhum Masters

Group B:
Alaska Milkmen
Pepsi Mega Bottlers
Shell Rimula X
Swift Mighty Meaty Hotdogs

Teams in a group will play against each other once and against teams in the other group twice; 11 games per team; Teams are then seeded by basis on win–loss records. Ties are broken among point differentials of the tied teams. Standings will be determined in one league table; teams do not qualify by basis of groupings.
The top five teams after the eliminations will advance to the semifinals.
Semifinals will be two round robin affairs with the remaining teams. Results from the elimination round will be carried over. A playoff incentive for a finals berth will be given to the team that will win at least five of their eight semifinal games.
The top two teams (or the top team and the winner of the playoff incentive) will face each other in a best-of-seven championship series. The next two teams will qualify for a best-of-five playoff for third place.

Elimination round

Team standings

Semifinals

Team standings

Cumulative standings

Semifinal round standings:

Philippine national team tune-up series 

After winning Game 1 of their series for third place against Swift on August 30, the San Miguel Beermen forfeited the third-place trophy to the Mighty Meaties and request the PBA to carry the national colors for the remaining games as part of their preparation for the upcoming Asian Games, amateur standouts Marlou Aquino, Kenneth Duremdes, Dennis Espino, Jeffrey Cariaso and EJ Feihl joined the team, RP-San Miguel split four games with Swift, and played Shell for their last tune-up game.

Finals

References

External links
 PBA.ph

Commissioner's Cup
PBA Commissioner's Cup